The Bhirum pony, also known as the Nigerian Pony, is a pony breed found in Nigeria. It developed in Nigeria’s northern regions.

References